South of the Highway (Swedish: Söder om landsvägen) is a 1936 Swedish comedy film directed by Gideon Wahlberg and starring Edvard Persson, Fritiof Billquist and Inga-Bodil Vetterlund.

The film's art direction was by Max Linder.

Cast
 Edvard Persson as Edward Månsson  
 Fritiof Billquist as Måns Månsson  
 Inga-Bodil Vetterlund as Inga Månsson  
 Alfhild Degerberg as Old Servant  
 Mim Persson as Karna 
 Benkt-Åke Benktsson as Truls  
 Holger Sjöberg as Elof  
 Nils Wahlbom as Isidor  
 Agda Helin as Maggie  
 Helge Mauritz as Aron Levander  
 Georg af Klercker as Mr. Berghammar  
 Signe Modin as Siri Berghammar  
 Nils Ekman as Arne Berghammar  
 Olov Wigren as Ivar  
 John Degerberg as Policeman 
 Margit Andelius as Måns' landlady  
 Astrid Bodin as Maid  
 Birgit Edlund as Måns' girlfriend in Lund 
 Erik Forslund as Farmhand  
 Olle Jansson as Student  
 Birger Malmsten as Student 
 John Norrman as Vet  
 Carl Reinholdz as Farmhand  
 Carl Ström as Chief of police  
 Lisa Wirström as Sofi, the professor's housemaid

References

Bibliography 
 Qvist, Per Olov & von Bagh, Peter. Guide to the Cinema of Sweden and Finland. Greenwood Publishing Group, 2000.

External links 
 

1936 films
1936 comedy films
Swedish comedy films
1930s Swedish-language films
Films directed by Gideon Wahlberg
Swedish black-and-white films
1930s Swedish films